Andorra–Grandvalira was an Andorran UCI Continental cycling team that existed only for the 2009 season. The team was run by Melcior Mauri who created the team and chose the riders.

Team roster

Major wins
Source:
2009
Prueba Villafranca de Ordizia, Jaume Rovira

References

UCI Continental Teams (Europe)
Cycling teams established in 2009
Cycling teams disestablished in 2009
Cycling teams based in Andorra